Solonetz is a Reference Soil Group of the World Reference Base for Soil Resources (WRB). They  have, within the upper 100 cm of the soil profile, a so-called "natric horizon" ("natrium" is the Latin term for sodium). There is a subsurface horizon (subsoil), higher in clay content than the upper horizon, that has more than 15% exchangeable sodium. The name is based on the Russian соль (sol, meaning salt). Ukrainian folk word "solontsi" means salty soil. In Ukraine there are many villages that are called Solontsі.

Solonetz zones are associated with Gleysols, Solonchaks and Kastanozems.

In USDA soil taxonomy, Solonetz corresponds to sodium-rich Alfisols.

See also
Chott
Salt marsh
Soil salinity
Solonchak
Takir
Salt pan

References 
 IUSS Working Group WRB: World Reference Base for Soil Resources, fourth edition. International Union of Soil Sciences, Vienna 2022. .

Further reading
 W. Zech, P. Schad, G. Hintermaier-Erhard: Soils of the World. Springer, Berlin 2022, Chapter 8.3.6.

External links 
 profile photos (with classification) WRB homepage
 profile photos (with classification) IUSS World of Soils

Pedology
Types of soil